Yeshiva Gedolah of the Five Towns (YGFT) (Mesoras Hatorah) is a yeshiva located in Woodmere, New York. It has approximately 70 students and several rabbis on staff. The primary goals of the yeshiva include advancing the students' level of Torah study, particularly Talmud, and strengthening their character traits through the study of mussar.

The yeshiva is very community-oriented. It is responsible for inspecting the five towns eruv on a weekly basis. It is currently remodeling the Hewlett eruv.

The yeshiva was founded in 2003 by its Rosh Kollel, Rav Yitzchak Knobel and its Rosh Yeshiva, Rav Moshe Zev Katzenstein

External links
Yeshiva Gedolah of the Five Towns
 https://maps.google.com/maps?q=846%20West%20Broadway,Woodmere,NY,USA(Yeshiva%20Gedolah%20of%20The%20Five%20Towns(Mesoras%20Hatorah))

Orthodox yeshivas in Nassau County, NY
Educational institutions established in 1985
1985 establishments in New York (state)